Irbis may refer to:

Russian for snow leopard
Irbis-E a Russian aircraft radar
Irbis (Khazar), 7th-century Khazar ruler
Irbis Seguy, 7th-century Turkic ruler
the Kazakh airline Irbis Air
Irbis Kazan, a junior fellow affiliate ice-hockey team of Ak Bars Kazan